Soteria Aliberty (1847–1929) was a Greek feminist and educator who founded the first Greek women's association, Ergani Athena.

Aliberty founded a school for girls in Romania and wrote biographical sketches of notable Greek women for the Women's Newspaper of Athens. Similar activities were being carried out in Greece around the same time by the Ladies' Central Committee and Kalliroi Parren's Union of Greek Women.  In 1893, she returned to Athens where she founded Ergani Athena and became editor of the literary journal Pleiades.

See also
 Feminism in Greece
 Kalliroi Parren

Notes

References
J. S. Uglow, F. Hinton. The International Dictionary of Women's Biography. Continuum International Publishing Group, 1989.

Further reading
 Stefanidou, Xenia (2007), "Greek Women in Positions of Power." Paper presented at the Hellenic American Professional Society Annual Meeting. November 4.

1847 births
1929 deaths
Greek feminists
Greek women journalists
Greek educators
19th-century Greek writers
19th-century Greek women writers
19th-century Greek educators